Thomas Gilbert "Gib" Bellis (21 April 1919 – 1 September 2000) was a Welsh professional footballer who played as a wing-half. He made appearances in the English Football League for Wrexham.

References

1919 births
2000 deaths
Sportspeople from Mold, Flintshire
Welsh footballers
Association football forwards
Buckley Town F.C. players
Wrexham A.F.C. players
Colwyn Bay F.C. players
Holywell Town F.C. players
English Football League players